Abar Tora Manush Ho is a 1973 Bangladeshi film starring Maruf Ahmed, Bobita, Farooque and Raisul Islam Asad. Khan Ataur Rahman earned both Best Film and Best Director Award at Bangladesh National Film Awards.

Music
 "Kiser Shok Koris Bhai" - N/A
 "Tumi Cheyechile Ogo Jante" - Abida Sultana
 "Ek Nodi Rokto Periye" - Shahnaz Rahmatullah

Awards
Bangladesh National Film Awards
 Best Film - Khan Ataur Rahman
 Best Director - khan Ataur Rahman

Bachsas Awards
 Best Screenplay - Khan Ataur Rahman

References

External links

1973 films
Bengali-language Bangladeshi films
Films scored by Khan Ataur Rahman
1970s Bengali-language films
Films based on the Bangladesh Liberation War
Best Film Bachsas Award winners